The 1984–85 Liga Artzit season saw Bnei Yehuda win the title and promotion to Liga Leumit. Maccabi Sha'arayim and Hapoel Jerusalem were also promoted.

Hapoel Ashkelon, Hapoel Rishon LeZion and Hapoel Kiryat Shmona were all relegated to Liga Alef.

Final table

References
Liga Artzit 1984/85 Final table Maariv, 9.6.85, Historical Jewish Press 
Previous seasons The Israel Football Association 

Liga Artzit seasons
Israel
2